The 1920 United States presidential election in Virginia took place on November 2, 1920. Voters chose 12 representatives, or electors to the Electoral College, who voted for president and vice president. This was also the first presidential election after the passage of the Nineteenth Amendment, which granted women the right to vote throughout the United States, including Virginia.

Virginia voted for the Democratic nominee, former Ohio Governor James M. Cox, over the Republican nominee, Ohio Senator Warren G. Harding. Harding ultimately won the national election with 60.32% of the vote.

Results

Results by county

References

Virginia
1920
1920 Virginia elections